Behaim is a lunar impact crater that is located near the eastern limb of the Moon, just to the south of the crater Ansgarius. To the south of Behaim is the crater Hecataeus, and to the east-southeast is Gibbs.

The inner walls along the rim of Behaim still displays traces of old, worn terraces. The rim has received a negligible amount of wear from subsequent bombardment, but does not form a circular shape due to an inward bulge along the northern wall. The crater has a notable central peak at the midpoint of the interior floor. A cleft-like feature crosses the southern rim and continues to the south.

Behaim is similar in appearance to Alpetragius crater near the center of the near side, although Behaim is larger.

Satellite craters
By convention these features are identified on lunar maps by placing the letter on the side of the crater midpoint that is closest to Behaim.

References

 
 
 
 
 
 
 
 
 
 
 
 

Impact craters on the Moon